Nigel Sinclair, CBE (born 31 March 1948) is a Scottish producer of Hollywood films.

Early life 

Sinclair was born in Corbridge, Northumberland, England. His family moved to Galloway, in southwest Scotland, a few years later where he grew up.  He went to boarding school at Monkton Combe School in England.  In 1966, he attended Gonville and Caius College, Cambridge, graduating in 1969.  After a short stint working as a researcher for the Department of Criminology, University of Cambridge, he qualified as a lawyer with the London firm then known as Denton, Hall and Burgin.  He practiced law in London and subsequently in the Middle East until 1980.  In 1979/1980, Sinclair attended Columbia University School of Law in New York and obtained a LAM in International Legal Studies, and qualified for the State Bar of California. In 1989, Sinclair founded his own firm, Sinclair Tennenbaum & Co., in Los Angeles. He practiced entertainment law until he retired from that practice in 1996 to found Intermedia with Guy East.

Film career 

Sinclair launched White Horse Pictures in 2014, with longtime partner Guy East—a content company that takes a Millennial approach to storytelling.

Prior to launching White Horse Pictures, Sinclair was the CEO and co-chairman of Exclusive Media, a global independent film company that financed, produced and globally distributed feature films and documentaries. With Exclusive, Sinclair produced Parkland, starring Zac Efron, Billy Bob Thornton and Paul Giamatti; Snitch, starring Dwayne Johnson; and End of Watch, starring Jake Gyllenhaal, Michael Peña, Anna Kendrick and America Ferrera.

In addition, Sinclair was executive producer on Ron Howard's epic action-thriller Rush, set in the spectacular world of Formula 1 auto racing. Along with Michael Shevloff and Paul Crowder, Sinclair also produced the documentary 1, the authorized history of Formula 1.

At White Horse, Sinclair's latest productions include a feature adaptation of Conn Iggulden's Emperor series about Julius Caesar's early years and a biopic about The Who drummer Keith Moon. The latter of the two projects will be produced with Exclusive.

Previously, Sinclair served as executive producer on George Clooney's The Ides of March, nominated for an Academy Award for Best Original Screenplay, and the Academy Award-winning documentary feature Undefeated, produced by Exclusive Media's documentary production arm Spitfire Pictures. Sinclair also served as an executive producer on the Hammer Films production and box-office hit The Woman in Black, starring Daniel Radcliffe.

Sinclair's other film credits include Peter Weir's The Way Back, starring Jim Sturgess and Ed Harris; Sliding Doors, starring Gwyneth Paltrow; Terminator 3: Rise of the Machines, starring Arnold Schwarzenegger; and Alan Parker's The Life of David Gale, starring Kevin Spacey and Kate Winslet.

Prior to co-founding Exclusive Media, Sinclair and Guy East (who is also co-chairman of White Horse Pictures), founded Intermedia Films in 1996, which grew to become one of the world's leading independent film companies. After their departure in 2002, Sinclair and East then founded Spitfire Pictures, which was merged with Hammer to form Exclusive Media in 2008.

Under the Spitfire Pictures label Sinclair produced (along with Olivia Harrison) the award-winning George Harrison: Living in the Material World, Martin Scorsese's biographical film about the life of George Harrison, which won an Emmy. He also produced the Bob Dylan documentary No Direction Home, also directed by Scorsese, which won an Emmy, two Grammy Awards, a Peabody Award and a DuPont.

In 2012, Sinclair won his second Grammy for Foo Fighters: Back and Forth and in 2007 he was nominated for a Grammy for Amazing Journey: The Story of The Who. Sinclair won his first Grammy in 2006 for No Direction Home.

His company Spitfire Pictures has been involved with Tongal since 2013, working with the company to crowd-source a documentary. According to the Los Angeles Times, Tongal users will submit pitch ideas, with Spitfire selecting the top five, and awarding one the winning idea before distributing the final project.

Personal life 

In 1981, Sinclair married Pat Craig and together they have one child in addition to Pat's two children. Sinclair now has three grandchildren.

Sinclair is active in a number of charities including the Santa Monica-based charity k9 Connection.  Sinclair is a member of the Academy of Motion Picture Arts and Sciences and BAFTA, having served on the board of directors for BAFTA LA many times.  Sinclair's principal hobby is as an amateur musician playing guitar and collecting guitars.

Filmography
He was a producer in all films unless otherwise noted.

Film

Documentary

Miscellaneous crew

Thanks

Television

References

External links 

 

Alumni of Gonville and Caius College, Cambridge
Grammy Award winners
Primetime Emmy Award winners
Living people
People from Dumfries
Scottish film producers
People educated at Monkton Combe School
1948 births